Piz Uccello is a mountain of the Swiss Lepontine Alps, overlooking the San Bernardino Pass in the canton of Graubünden. It lies on the range culminating at the Einshorn.

References

External links

 Piz Uccello on Hikr

Mountains of Graubünden
Mountains of the Alps
Lepontine Alps
Mountains of Switzerland
Two-thousanders of Switzerland
Rheinwald
Mesocco